Ting Inc. is an American internet service provider founded by Tucows in 2012.  It originally consisted of Ting Mobile, a mobile virtual network operator, and Ting Internet, an internet service provider that offered gigabit fiber Internet. In August 2020, Ting Mobile was sold to Dish Wireless. Today, Tucows continues to provide the enablement software for Ting Mobile (via Wavelo) and continues to operate Ting Internet independently.

Ting Internet
Ting Internet is an American internet service provider. On December 15, 2014, Ting announced it was buying Blue Ridge Internetworks of Charlottesville, Virginia, which was already building fiber Internet. They began offering symmetrical gigabit fiber internet without bandwidth caps. Since expanding the existing fiber network in Charlottesville, Ting has also launched a similar service in 13 other markets. As of April 2022, they service the following areas:

 Alexandria, Virginia
 Charlottesville, Virginia
 Fullerton, California
 Solana Beach, California
 Centennial, Colorado
 Greater Sandpoint, Idaho
 Westminster, Maryland
 Fuquay-Varina, North Carolina
 Holly Springs, North Carolina
 Rolesville, North Carolina
 Wake Forest, North Carolina
 Encinitas, California
 Culver City, California

Ting's future expansion plans include Roaring Fork, Colorado.

In May 2016, Ting Internet launched the Bring Your Own Router option, allowing customers to use Ting's optical network terminal at no additional cost, while pairing it with their own third party router.

In October 2021 Ting Internet announced Mural, a collection of local news about the arts and small businesses in their Ting Towns.

See also
 Ting Mobile

References

External links
 
 

Telecommunications companies established in 2012
Mobile phone companies of the United States
Dish Network
Tucows